Atropanthe is a genus of flowering plants belonging to the family Solanaceae.

Its native range is China.

Species:

Atropanthe mairei 
Atropanthe sinensis

References

Solanaceae
Solanaceae genera